The 2019–20 season was Debreceni VSC's 36th competitive and consecutive season in the Nemzeti Bajnokság I and the 71st year in existence as a handball club.

Players

Squad information

Goalkeepers
 16  Ágnes Triffa
 61  Dóra Szabó
 90  Viktória Oguntoye
Left Wingers
 17  Éva Vantara-Kelemen (c)
 47  Panna Szabó
Right Wingers
 6  Nóra Varsányi
 72  Rebeka Arany
Line players
 13  Petra Tóvizi
 18  Réka Bordás

Left Backs
 20  Anita Bulath
 80  Jelena Despotović
Centre Backs
 22  Elke Karsten
 38  Petra Vámos
 49  Panna Borgyos
Right Backs
 33  Anna Kovács
 77  Szabina Karnik

Transfers
Source:  hetmeteres.hu

 In:
 Szabina Karnik (from MTK Budapest)
  Elke Karsten (from  Bera Bera)
 Petra Vámos (from NEKA)

 Out:
  Lotte Grigel (to  Nantes)
  Anna Punko (temporarily pauses her career)
  Mădălina Zamfirescu (to  SCM Râmnicu Vâlcea)

Club

Technical Staff

Source: Coaches, Management

Uniform
 Supplier: Adidas
 Main sponsor: Schaeffler / tippmix / Globus / City of Debrecen
 Back sponsor: Cívis Ház / RISKA / Volkswagen
 Shorts sponsor: Bútor Outler / SzertárSport

Competitions

Overview

Nemzeti Bajnokság I

Results by round

Matches

Results overview

Hungarian Cup

Matches

EHF Cup

Second qualifying round

DVSC Schaeffler won, 69–58 on aggregate.

Third qualifying round

DVSC Schaeffler won, 73–52 on aggregate.

Group stage

Matches

Results overview

Statistics

Top scorers
Includes all competitive matches. The list is sorted by shirt number when total goals are equal.
Last updated on 29 January 2020

Attendances
List of the home matches:

References

Notes

External links
 
 DVSC Schaeffler  at eurohandball.com

 
Debreceni VSC